is a semi-retired professional wrestler, best known for his work in Dramatic Dream Team (DDT) under the ring name .

Professional wrestling career

DDT Pro Wrestling (1999–2012; 2022–present)
Initially trained by New Japan Pro-Wrestling, Sawada found prominence after making his debut for DDT in 1999. He worked for the promotion for over thirteen years, becoming a two-time KO-D Openweight Champion and a seven-time Ironman Heavymetalweight Champion, before retiring in November 2012.

Sawada made his return to professional wrestling on March 20, 2022, at Judgement 2022: DDT 25th Anniversary where he teamed up with Akarangers (Gentaro and Takashi Sasaki) and Suicide Boyz (Mikami and Thanomsak Toba), being accompanied to the ring by Naomi Susan to defeat Toru Owashi, Antonio Honda, Kazuki Hirata and Yoshihiko for the KO-D 10-Man Tag Team Championship.

Championships and accomplishments
DDT Pro-Wrestling
Ironman Heavymetalweight Championship (7 times)
Jiyūgaoka 6-Person Tag Team Championship (2 times)
KO-D Openweight Championship (2 times)
KO-D 10-Man Tag Team Championship (1 time) – with Gentaro, Takashi Sasaki, Mikami and Thanomsak Toba
King of DDT Tournament (2004)
Pro Wrestling Crusaders
PWC Junior Heavyweight Championship (1 time)
Other titles
CMA Heavyweight Championship (1 time)

References

1964 births
Japanese male professional wrestlers
Living people
People from Tokyo
20th-century professional wrestlers
21st-century professional wrestlers
Ironman Heavymetalweight Champions
Jiyūgaoka 6-Person Tag Team Champions
KO-D 8-Man/10-Man Tag Team Champions
KO-D Openweight Champions